Azurdia is a surname. Notable people with the surname include:

Elmar Rene Rojas Azurdia (1942–2018), Guatemalan painters and  architect
Enrique Peralta Azurdia (1908–1997), Guatemalan politician and President of Guatemala 
Margarita Azurdia (1931–1998), Guatemalan painter, poet and writer and artist
Óscar Mendoza Azurdia (1917–1995), Guatemalan politician and President of Guatemala 
Roberto Azurdia (born 1926), Guatemalan writer, diplomat and physician